Cariloop is a health and wellness company based in Dallas, Texas. The company's Caregiver Support Platform pairs healthcare coaching services with a secure online case management portal to assist users in managing care transitions.

Business 
Cariloop users receive an online case file where documents are stored, accessed, and reviewed by users and healthcare coaches. The company's healthcare coaches are licensed or certified in fields such as nursing, social work, case management, therapy, and counseling. Healthcare coaches can assist users in creating caregiving plans, and can help find answers, resources, or contacts for medical, financial, and legal questions. Cariloop's vision is to create a new global standard for planning and managing transitions in life.

The company's business model focuses on employee benefits packages. Individual memberships are also offered.

History 
Cariloop, Inc. was founded in July 2012 by Michael Walsh and Steven Theesfeld. The company completed the Health Wildcatters accelerator program in 2013 and launched version one of its website in 2014. Version one of Cariloop.com was a search wizard that matched users with care providers based on pricing, location, type of care, and availability. The company's original business model was comparable to a referral service, similar to A Place for Mom. The company partnered with the Texas Organization of Residential Care Homes during the first version of its product.

The company shifted its focus from care providers to caregivers, which led to the launching of the second version of Cariloop.com in August 2015. The second platform included healthcare coaching services and a digital case management portal.

Funding 
After graduating from Health Wildcatters in 2013, Cariloop raised $400,000 in seed funding. The company also won $50,000 in prize money at the National Angel Summit in 2014. In 2015, Cariloop raised $180,000 from its seed round investors.

Directors and Advisors 
Michael Walsh is one of the company's co-founders and CEO. Walsh serves on the company's Board of Directors.
Steven Theesfeld is one of the company's co-founders. Theesfeld serves on the company's Board of Directors.
 Michael Stoltz, M.D. serves on the company's Board of Directors.
Michael Gorton, J.D. serves on the company's Board of Directors. Gorton was the founding CEO of Teladoc.
Wendy Whittington, M.D. serves on the company's Board of Directors.
Dan Slaven serves as a Board of Directors Observer and manages the fundraising efforts for the company.
Joshua Robertson serves as a Board of Directors Observer.
 Anne Lipton, M.D., Ph.D. serves on the company's Advisory Board. Lipton is a board-certified neurologist with specialization in dementia.
Mark Victor Hansen serves on the company's Advisory Board. Hansen is a co-author for the Chicken Soup for the Soul Series.

References 

Companies based in Dallas
American companies established in 2012
2012 establishments in Texas
Health care companies based in Texas